James Reid (born 25 May 1974) is a New Zealand singer-songwriter, guitarist, producer, and video producer, best known as the lead singer in the band The Feelers.

Reid is regarded as one of New Zealand's most successful songwriters and rock musicians, having formed The Feelers in 1992, which went on to sell more albums than any other New Zealand band to date. Reid was also a producer for the band, and is an experienced video producer.

In November 2013, Reid released his first solo album, entitled Saint.

Early life 
Reid was born in Christchurch, New Zealand, on 25 May 1974. With distant Scottish and French heritage, he has four siblings; two older sisters and two older brothers. Coming from a talented family, his older brother Donald Reid is also an accomplished musical artist.  He developed an interest in music as early as four years old, learning to play his first song, "Dip your hips baby".

Reid was sent to a religious boarding school as a child, attending church daily and joining the choir. As a teenager he attended Christ's College, then went on to study fine art and film at the University of Canterbury.

Personal life 
Reid is living in Auckland, New Zealand.

He describes his vocal range as soprano.

Influences 
Reid has listed several bands and musicians as influences in his music, including The Beatles, Cat Stevens, Nine Inch Nails, David Bowie and Soundgarden. He considers his favourite genres to be "pop, rock, indie, and country".

Career

The Feelers (1992–present) 
Reid formed The Feelers in 1992 with guitarist and drummer Hamish Gee. The band released their first album, Supersystem, in 1998, and went on to release four more by 2011.

Reid's musical career has led to five number one albums on the NZ Music Charts, as well as eight music awards with The Feelers, including winning Songwriter of the Year in the 1999 New Zealand Music Awards.

Broken Records 
Since the mid-2000s, Reid has spearheaded Broken Records, an Auckland-based label that works with New Zealand rock bands, including The Valves. This is not to be confused with the Christian label of the same name, which closed in the early 1990s.

Solo career 
In 2013, Reid released his first solo album, entitled Saint. The album was notably different from his work with The Feelers, featuring a more delicate acoustic sound. It was released on 22 November on iTunes.

References 

1974 births
APRA Award winners
Living people
New Zealand musicians
People educated at Christ's College, Christchurch